Cecil Elwin (born 16 July 1955) is a Dominican cricketer. He played in five first-class and six List A matches for the Windward Islands from 1977 to 1984.

See also
 List of Windward Islands first-class cricketers

References

External links
 

1955 births
Living people
Dominica cricketers
Windward Islands cricketers